The Abgig obelisk (also known as the Faiyum obelisk) is an ancient stone monument erected by the Egyptian pharaoh Senusret I  1971–1926 BC near what is now Faiyum. Sometime in the late 17th or early 18th century, the monument was toppled and split in two. In 1972, the Egyptian government restored the obelisk and placed it near the entrance of modern-day Faiyum.

Description 
The obelisk of Abgig is made of red granite, and when it was first erected, it likely stood 12.9 meters high with a 3.6 meters wide base. The obelisk tapers upwards and has a rounded top. In the middle of the obelisk's crest, a recess can be found, which may have once housed a sculpted figure. Gaston Maspero and Hourig Sourouzian both argued that this figure was probably made of metal and depicted a falcon, although this suggestion is speculative at best.

Obverse side
The obverse (north) side of the obelisk features five detailed registers, each of which depicts two instances of the pharaoh Senusret I (identified in several places as "Kheper-ka-ra" [], which means the "Manifestation of the Ka of Ra") standing back to back and facing a pair of gods. A description of the registers, arranged from top to the bottom, is as follows:

Below the fifth register, there once existed fourteen columns of hieroglyphs. By the 19th century, this text had been badly eroded, and Karl Richard Lepsius was able to copy only parts of the inscription. Today, none of this inscription remains. Because the text copied by Lepsius is so fragmentary, determining what the inscription once said is likely impossible. That said, Marco Zecch postulates that the columns may have recorded a speech that  Senusret I delivered to his court concerning the construction of new monuments. Zecch bases his hypothesis on the fact that similar inscriptions have been identified on a variety of objects that were constructed during Senusret I's reign. Roland Enmarch, on the other hand, has suggested that the text is an example of a königsnovelle (i.e., "a specific literary form describing a unique event in the life of the king-a single, simple, great deed").

Eastern and western sides

On the eastern side of the monument is a hieroglyphic inscription that reads: "Horus Ankh-mesut, Two Ladies Ankh-mesut, king of Upper and Lower Egypt Kheper-ka-ra, beloved of Montu, lord of Thebes [...]". On the western side, there is a similar inscription that reads: "Horus Ankh-mesut, Two Ladies Ankh-mesut, king of Upper Egypt Kheper-ka-ra, beloved of Ptah south of his wall [...]".

Reverse side
Unlike the obverse side, the monument's reverse (south) side has not been as thoroughly documented. This side of the monument features a register in which two depictions of the king are shown standing back-to-back. While the figure on the left has been eroded considerably, the one on the right has largely been preserved. In the preserved portion, the kingexplicitly identified as "the good god Senusret"is shown wearing a white crown and offering vases to Atum and another god.

History
The earliest mentions of the obelisk were made in 1672 by Johann Michael Vansleb, and by Richard Pococke in the mid-18th century; the latter, in his work Description of the East, described the structure as "a very particular obelisk of a red granite" that was "much decay'd all round for ten feet high, but mostly on the south side; the west side is almost entirely defaced, and at the south west and south east corners, it is much broken for about twenty feet high". Pococke's description suggests that the obelisk was still standing, but by the time the French engineer A. N. Caristie visited the monument near the turn of the 19th century, it been "knocked down on the ground [and] broke[n] into two pieces".

In the following years, the obelisk was visited and described by Karl Richard Lepsius ( 184245), Edward William Lane (1827), John Gardner Wilkinson (1827), and Mohamed Chaaban (1925).

In 1972, the obelisk was restored by Egyptian authorities and moved to Medinet el-Fayyum.

See also
 List of Egyptian obelisks

References

Bibliography 

 
 
 
 
 
 
 
 
 
 
 
 

Ancient Egyptian obelisks
Relocated Egyptian obelisks